Tracey Robert Mann (born December 17, 1976) is an American businessman and politician who has served as the U.S. representative from Kansas's 1st congressional district since 2021. The district, popularly known as "the Big First," includes parts of 63 counties in central and western Kansas and is the seventh-largest district in the nation that does not cover an entire state.

Mann served as the 50th lieutenant governor of Kansas from 2018 to 2019. He was appointed by Governor Jeff Colyer in February 2018, after Colyer ascended from the lieutenant governorship upon Sam Brownback's resignation.

Early life and education 
Mann is a fifth-generation Kansan who was born and raised on his family farm near Quinter, Kansas. He worked in the fields and feed yard with his grandfather, father, and brother. Mann attended Quinter High School, where he was a part of seven state championship teams, including football, track, quiz bowl, and parliamentary procedure. In his senior year, Mann was elected to serve as FFA president and student council president. During his college years, Mann worked as an intern for then-U.S. Representative Jerry Moran. He also served as the student body president of Kansas State University.

Lieutenant Governor of Kansas

Elections

2018 primary for governor 

Jeff Colyer narrowly lost the 2018 Republican primary to Kris Kobach, and he and Mann left office the next year.

Tenure 

Two weeks after Colyer ascended to the office of Governor of Kansas, Mann was appointed as Colyer's lieutenant governor. He was sworn in on February 14, 2018.

State Objections Board 
Michael Capps filed to run as a Republican in 2018 for the Kansas House District 97 seat using an address on the south side of Wichita. Months before the election, Representative Chuck Weber, the incumbent in heavily Republican House District 85, which included part of north Wichita and suburbs to the north and northeast, withdrew his candidacy for reelection and gave notice of his resignation, effective July 14, 2018. Capps then changed his campaign filing, running instead for the District 85 seat, giving a north Wichita address, with a business mailing address of 6505 East Central Avenue, #110. He claimed he resided at the Governeour street address, though the home was scheduled to be sold at auction on June 27, 2018. Democrats alleged Capps did not actually live at that address. The Kansas Objections Board, composed of Mann, Kansas Secretary of State Kris Kobach and Kansas Attorney General Derek Schmidt, refused to uphold the complaint. The Sedgwick County Republican Central Committee appointed Capps to fill the remainder of Weber's 85th District term. Marc Bennett, District Attorney of Sedgwick County, petitioned to have Capps removed from office after an investigation of child abuse caused him to be decertified and removed as a Court Appointed Special Advocate. In 2020, he lost the Republican primary to Patrick Penn, who received 74.4% of the vote.

U.S. House of Representatives

Elections

2010 

Mann ran for Kansas's 1st congressional district in the 2010 elections to the United States House of Representatives, losing to Tim Huelskamp in the Republican primary.

During his 2010 campaign, Mann repeatedly insisted President Barack Obama needed to produce his birth certificate to prove that he was an American citizen. The Hutchinson News withdrew its endorsement of Mann, stating, "he questions the citizenship of President Barack Obama despite evidence that is irrefutable to most objective, rational people - including a birth certificate released by the Hawaii secretary of state and birth announcements printed in Honolulu's two major newspapers." On June 21, 2010, Mann said on a Salina radio program that he thought Obama "needs to come forth with his papers and show everyone that he is an American citizen." He made similar comments that day at a forum at Elkhart, Kansas. Though Mann formerly expressed support for birtherism, he has since renounced those beliefs.

2020 

Mann made another bid for the 1st in 2020 after two-term incumbent Roger Marshall gave up the seat to run for U.S. Senate. On August 4, 2020, Mann defeated Air Force veteran Bill Clifford in the Republican primary–the real contest in this heavily Republican district–and Democrat Kali Barnett in the general election, with 71% of the vote.

Tenure

Iraq
In June 2021, Mann was one of 49 House Republicans to vote to repeal the AUMF against Iraq.

Committee assignments 

 Committee on Agriculture
 Subcommittee on Livestock, Dairy, and Poultry (Chair)
 Subcommittee on Commodity Markets, Digital Assets, and Rural Development
 Subcommittee on Nutrition, Foreign Agriculture, and Horticulture
 Committee on Transportation and Infrastructure
Subcommittee on Highways and Transit
Subcommittee on Aviation
Subcommittee on Railroads, Pipelines and Hazardous Materials
Committee on Small Businesses

Caucus memberships 

 House Hunger Caucus
 FFA Caucus

Electoral history

Personal life
Mann resides in Salina, Kansas, where he works as a commercial real estate broker. He also owns his family's farm in Quinter, Kansas.

References

External links
Representative Tracey Mann official U.S. House website
 Tracey Mann for Congress
 
 

|-

|-

1976 births
Living people
American real estate brokers
Candidates in the 2010 United States elections
Kansas State University alumni
Lieutenant Governors of Kansas
People from Quinter, Kansas
Politicians from Salina, Kansas
Republican Party members of the United States House of Representatives from Kansas
Candidates in the 2018 United States elections
21st-century American politicians